Nikola Mihaylov Mihov (11 December 1891 – 1 February 1945) was a Bulgarian lieutenant general of artillery who served as one of the three Regents of Bulgaria for the underage Simeon II (1943–44).

Biography 
 
Nikola Mihov was born on 11 December 1891, in Veliko Tarnovo, in the then-Principality of Bulgaria. Graduated from the Sofia Military School in 1911. Commanded an artillery battery during the Balkan Wars, took part in the siege of Odrin. From April 1915 he was an assistant of the artillery inspector at the Military School. During World War I, Mihov commanded a battery in the 15th Artillery Regiment and took part in the capture of the Tutrakan fortress, defended by Romanian troops. In 1917, commanded the 1st horsed artillery unit.

In 1922–29, Mihov was an artillery instructor at the Military School, an officer of the 4th Artillery Regiment, an adjutant in the artillery department of the War Ministry, and commander of a unit in the Sofia defense area. In 1929–32, he was the chief of a section of the Artillery Inspectorate. In 1932–33, he was the chief of the Engineering Inspectorate. Mihov commanded that the 7th Artillery Division in 1933–35. Since 1935 he was the head of the training department of the Artillery Inspectorate. Also around that time, Mihov was the editor of the publication Artillery Review. In 1936, Mihov became the assistant of the commander of the 3rd Division. Later that year he became its commander. He served as the head of the military school from 17 February 1937 until 19 April 1941.

In April–August 1941 he commanded the 5th Army, which took part in the invasion and occupation of Macedonia. In 1941–42, Mihov commanded the 1st Army, with its headquarters being in Sofia. From 11 April 1942 until 14 September 1943 he was the Minister of War in the second government of Bogdan Filov, a supporter of his politics.

On 9 September 1943, he became one of the three members of the Regent Council, which led Bulgaria after the death of Tsar Boris III and the coronation of the young Simeon II. One year later, after pro-Soviet forces rose to power in Bulgaria, Mihov was arrested by Bulgarian communists. On 1 February 1945, Mihov was sentenced to death by the so-called People's court and shot on the same day.

Mihov was pardoned by the Supreme Court of Bulgaria on 26 August 1996. His diary, which he wrote while being the regent of Bulgaria, was published in 2004. It covers the period from 19 September 1943 to 7 September 1944 – just a day before the anti-fascist coup.

Ranks 
Junior ensign (22 September 1911)
Ensign (1 November 1913)
Captain (30 May 1917)
Major (15 March 1923)
Lieutenant colonel (1 April 1927)
Colonel (6 May 1933)
Major general (3 October 1938)
Lieutenant general (1 January 1942)

Awards 

Order of Bravery (1st and 2nd class)
Order of Saint Alexander (3rd and 4th class)
Order of Military Merit (2nd class)

Iron Cross

Sources 
 Tasho Tashev, Ministers of Bulgaria 1879–1999. Sofia, AI "Prof. Marin Drinov" / Publishing house of the Ministry of Defense, 1999,  /  (in Bulgarian)
 Biography on Sklaviny.ru
 Biography on Generals.dk
 Biography on Boinslava.net

1891 births
1945 deaths
People from Veliko Tarnovo
Regents of Bulgaria
Bulgarian military personnel of the Balkan Wars
Bulgarian military personnel of World War I
Bulgarian military personnel of World War II
People executed by Bulgaria by firing squad
People executed by the People's Republic of Bulgaria
Bulgarian generals
Executed Bulgarian people
People's Court (Bulgaria)
Defence ministers of Bulgaria